"Cosmo" is a song by French singer and rapper Soprano. It was released on 18 August 2014.

Charts

References

2014 songs
2014 singles
French-language songs